My Little Pony: Equestria Girls – Spring Breakdown is a 2019 Flash animated one-hour television special based on Hasbro's My Little Pony: Equestria Girls toyline and media franchise, which is a spin-off of the 2010 relaunch of Hasbro's My Little Pony toyline. Written and edited by Nick Confalone and directed by Ishi Rudell and Katrina Hadley, it is the third one-hour Equestria Girls special, following Forgotten Friendship (2018) and Rollercoaster of Friendship (2018), and preceding Sunset's Backstage Pass (2019), and Holidays Unwrapped (2019).

The special aired on Discovery Family on March 30, 2019.

Plot
The students of Canterlot High are on a cruise ship, excited for spring break. They all want to relax, except for Rainbow Dash, who fantasizes about fighting evil Equestrian magic. The others are not so keen and split up to pursue their own interests. Rainbow Dash, in her excitement to convince the others to look for danger with her, inadvertently ruins their fun. After a conversation with Trixie, Rainbow Dash gets the idea of attempting to attract danger using the girls' Equestrian magic. She suggests that during the show they were scheduled to put on, they "pony up". Despite this, the others are still not so keen, annoyed at her for ruining their fun. However, during the show, the girls "pony up" anyway. Suddenly, a storm rolls in and a power outage occurs on the whole ship. Rainbow Dash is keen to blame this on evil magic and tries to convince the others to support her search, however, they decide to split up and work rationally.

Rainbow Dash is left alone on the deck and sees a strange light in the ocean. She quickly forces the girls to join her and relays the information to them. However, as she has now ruined their fun for the second time and has been on the lookout for evil the whole time, the girls don't believe her.

The next day, Twilight Sparkle and Sunset Shimmer go to look for Rainbow Dash, only to discover that she has left the cruise on a lifeboat to try and find evil on her own. After telling the others about the situation, Twilight and Sunset decide to follow Rainbow Dash onto a remote island, where they find her stuck in quicksand. While attempting to save her, they are attacked by a plant monster. Sunset senses Equestrian magic in the sand pool and pushes Rainbow Dash under the sand, before jumping in with Twilight. The sand turns out to have been covering a portal to Equestria. Turned into ponies, Sunset and the others sneak into Ponyville to find Princess Twilight Sparkle.

At the same time, Applejack, Fluttershy, Pinkie Pie and Rarity are still on the cruise, trying to survive the storm, until the ship runs aground on a reef near the island. Unaware of the danger their friends are in, Sunset, Twilight and Rainbow Dash are catching up with Princess Twilight, who shows them an artifact from her battle with the Storm King. Rainbow Dash recognizes his symbol as the one she saw in the sea earlier. Realizing the danger their friends are in, Princess Twilight sends them back to the human world with the Storm King's staff, which Twilight, Sunset and Rainbow Dash use to get rid of the storm. However, the ship is still sinking and the people on it are still in danger.

The girls reunite and together rescue the people from the cruise, bringing them to the island. Now stranded, Sunset comes up with the idea to bring them all home via the portal to Equestria. The special ends as everyone from the cruise, now ponies, enter Princess Twilight's castle and ask for her help.

Cast 
 Ashleigh Ball — Rainbow Dash / Applejack
 Tara Strong — Twilight Sparkle / Princess Twilight Sparkle
 Rebecca Shoichet — Sunset Shimmer
 Andrea Libman — Pinkie Pie / Fluttershy
 Tabitha St. Germain — Rarity
 Cathy Weseluck — Spike the Dragon
 Kathleen Barr — Trixie Lulamoon / Puffed Pastry
 Jason Michas — Ragamuffin

Production
According to co-director Katrina Hadley, Spring Breakdown was split into six parts instead of the usual five from the past two specials, with each part having an approximate runtime of seven minutes and thirty seconds and that "there will be no cut scenes as each part was timed and cut to be reassembled for broadcast on TV without losing any content."

Release
Spring Breakdown premiered on Discovery Family on March 30, 2019. The special was edited down into a cut of six episodes on the official My Little Pony YouTube channel. Its first episode was uploaded on April 12, 2019 and its last episode on May 17.

Episodes

Marketing
A teaser trailer for the special was shown at the 2018 My Little Pony San Diego Comic-Con panel.

References

External links
 

My Little Pony: Friendship Is Magic
2019 television specials
2010s animated television specials
Films set on islands
Films set on ships
Films about parallel universes
Equestria Girls films
Animated crossover television specials